Jakob Alt (27 September 1789 – 30 September 1872) was a German painter and lithographer.

Life
Alt was the son of Barbara Alt, nee Horst, and Frankfurt carpenter Johann Leonhart Alt. He was born at Frankfurt am Main in 1789, where he received his early artistic education. Later he moved to Vienna and entered the Academy. He soon became noted as a landscape painter and made various journeys throughout Austria and Italy, painting, as he went along, views in the neighborhood of the Danube and in the city of Vienna.

In later life Alt painted a lot in watercolor; he was also a lithographer. In 1830 the future Emperor Ferdinand I of Austria began a project to commission paintings of the most beautiful views in the Empire. Alt, and his eldest son, Rudolf von Alt painted about 170 of the 300 works executed before the scheme came to an end in 1849. Alt's extensive herbarium is now in the Lower Austrian State Museum .

He died in Vienna in 1872.

Gallery

See also
 List of German painters

References

Sources

External links

Jakob Alt at ArtCyclopedia

19th-century German painters
19th-century German male artists
German male painters
1789 births
1872 deaths
Artists from Frankfurt
Academy of Fine Arts Vienna alumni
German lithographers
German watercolourists